Nine Mile River is a community in the Canadian province of Nova Scotia, located in the Municipal District of East Hants. It takes its name from the river which flows through it. It is District 9 for the Municipality of East Hants, and currently served by Councillor Eldon Hebb.

Community life 
Nine Mile River has a small population, thus creating a small-town rural atmosphere to its inhabitants. In the community there is a small United Church of Canada and a volunteer fire departments.

Economy 
While most people residents work in surrounding communities or in nearby urban centres such as Halifax, Nova Scotia or Truro, Nova Scotia, there are still several small businesses within the community. Nanny & Poppy's is a small convenience store with a restaurant that offers dine-in or take-out menus year round. Nine Mile River has two campgrounds, Renfew Camping and Riverland Campground. Both operate from the middle of May until the end of September, and bring an influx of summer residents to the community. Nine Mile River was previously home to the Renfrew Golf Course, which was permanently closed in 2019.

Recreation 
Nine Mile River has a large community centre that offers bingo every Wednesday night, country & western dances on Saturday nights, and monthly jamboree. The community centre also has a full-size softball field, as well as a recently rebuilt playground.

Nine Mile River Trails in located within the community limits of Nine Mile River. This is a multi-use trail system with nearly 7.5 km of groomed and maintained trails.

Education 
Children in Nine Mile River attend school in surrounding communities, as there is not a large enough population to support a stand-alone school in the community. Children in grades primary to 5 attend school at Elmsdale District School in Elmsdale, Nova Scotia. From grades 6 to 8 children attended Riverside Education Centre in Milford Station, Nova Scotia. Once children reach the grades of 9 to 12, they attend Hants East Rural High School in Milford Station, Nova Scotia.

Climate

Average Temperatures (°C)

See also
Lower Nine Mile River
Upper Nine Mile River

References 
Nine Mile River on Destination Nova Scotia

Communities in Hants County, Nova Scotia
General Service Areas in Nova Scotia